Udea poliostolalis is a moth in the family Crambidae. It was described by George Hampson in 1918. It is found in Taiwan.

The forewings are grey brown with a leaden gloss and with a faint erect brown antemedial line, as well as a faint dark discoidal bar. The postmedial line is rather diffused dark brown, very slightly waved, excurved from the costa to below vein 3, then retracted to below the angle of the cell and erect to the inner margin. The hindwings are grey brown with a leaden gloss.

References

poliostolalis
Moths described in 1918